David Dineen-Porter is an actor, comedian and musician from Toronto, Ontario, Canada.

Career

Dineen-Porter has performed stand-up and sketch comedy in Toronto since 1997 and is a regular on Laugh Sabbath. He is former director of the University of Toronto comedy review 'The Bob', and is co-founder of sketch troupes Uncle Sevario, Someone and the Somethings, and The Iliads.

He has also been a featured performer at the Tuesday Riot in Chicago in early 2007.
In 2013, David starred in the Canadian independent feature film, Everyday Is Like Sunday, as Mark – a ne'er do well Torontonian trying to get his life together.

As of 2015 he was a writer with The Late Late Show.

Filmography
War of the Dead (2006) (V)
Blood Creek (2006) (V)
Chicknapping (2006) (V)
Screwed Over (3 episodes 2006) (TV)
L'Brondelle's Universe (2008)
 Everyday Is Like Sunday (2013)

Discography
"Building Blocks" (upcoming March 25, 2010) Blocks Recording Club
"Relationships to Me" (2009) Superbutton
Weezer: The 8-bit Album (2009) Pterodactyl Squad
"System Override" (2009) Blocks Recording Club
"The Company (remix)" (2009) (original by Kids on TV)
"Alice Part 2" (2008) (Limited Edition free CD)
"Alice Part 1: Fecal Alcohol Syndrome" (2007) Superbutton

References

External links
Official Site

1979 births
Living people
Canadian male comedians
Canadian male film actors
Canadian people of English descent
Comedians from Toronto
Male actors from Toronto
Musicians from Toronto
Chiptune musicians
Canadian rock musicians
Canadian atheists